Changai (also Romanized as Changā’ī; also known as Changā’ī-ye Aşgharābād, Changā’ī-ye Vasaţ, and Changūi Wast) is a village in Koregah-e Gharbi Rural District, in the Central District of Khorramabad County, Lorestan Province, Iran. At the 2006 census, its population was 1,207, in 229 families.

References 

Towns and villages in Khorramabad County